The Shire of Chiltern was a local government area about  north-northeast of Melbourne, the state capital of Victoria, Australia.

History

Chiltern was first incorporated as a road district on 1 December 1862, and became a shire on 11 May 1874. It annexed the Barnawartha Ward from the Shire of Yackandandah on 14 May 1913, and the Lilliput Ward from the Shire of Rutherglen in February 1917. On 10 October 1989, it also annexed parts of the Belvoir Ward of the Rural City of Wodonga.

On 18 November 1994, the Shire of Chiltern was abolished, and along with parts of the Shires of Beechworth, Rutherglen and Yackandandah, was merged into the newly created Shire of Indigo. However, the Barnawartha North region was annexed to the Rural City of Wodonga.

Wards

The Shire of Chiltern was divided into three ridings, each of which elected three councillors:
 Barnawartha Riding
 Chiltern Riding
 Indigo Riding

Towns and localities
 Barnawartha
 Barnawartha North
 Chiltern*
 Chiltern Valley
 Indigo Valley

* Council seat.

Population

* Estimate in the 1958 Victorian Year Book.

References

External links
 Victorian Places - Chiltern and Chiltern Shire

Chiltern